Leslie Brown Hofton (3 March 1888 – January 1971) was an English footballer who played as a full-back for Manchester United in two spells in the 1910s. Born in Sheffield, Hofton began his career at Kiveton Park, before moving to Glossop via Worksop Town and Denaby United in April 1908.

In July 1910, Hofton became Manchester United's first £1,000 signing, beating the previous club record of £700, which was spent on Alex Bell in 1903. However, despite his record price tag, it took Hofton seven months to make his United debut, appearing for the first time away to Newcastle United on 18 February 1911. He then left the club on a free transfer in May 1913. The First World War broke out just over a year later, but one year after its conclusion, in September 1919, Hofton re-signed for Manchester United. He continued to play for the club for two-and-a-half more years, amassing a total of 18 appearances for the club, before being sold to Denaby Main in February 1922.

References

External links
Profile at MUFCinfo.com

1888 births
1971 deaths
Footballers from Sheffield
English footballers
Association football fullbacks
Kiveton Park F.C. players
Manchester United F.C. players
English Football League players
Denaby United F.C. players
English Football League representative players